Hector was a small steam vessel built in Roche Harbor, Washington in 1897.  The vessel was worked as a cannery tender and a tug boat in the San Juan Islands and on Puget Sound from 1897 to 1913.

Career
Hector was built for the brothers Capt. Thomas Gawley and Engineer Hector Gawley of Lopez Island.  The vessel was used for some years as a chartered fish-trap tender in the San Juan Islands.  Later Hector was sold and transferred to Tacoma where it was operated as a tug.

Explosion and fire
In April 1913, Hector, making the first trip after having refitted with a new boiler was raising steam off Purdy Spit when an apparent coal gas explosion occurred.  Harold Lanning was able to rescue the crew with his  motor vessel.  The burned hull of Hector was towed to the shore, where beachcombers eventually removed everything usable from the hulk.

Notes

References 
 Newell, Gordon R., ed., H.W. McCurdy Marine History of the Pacific Northwest,  Superior Publishing Co., Seattle, WA (1966)
 United States. Dept. of the Treasury. Bureau of Statistics, Annual list of merchant vessels of the United States (1912)

Ships built in Washington (state)
1897 ships
Steamboats of Washington (state)
Propeller-driven steamboats of Washington (state)
Steam tugs
Steam tugs of Washington (state)
Maritime incidents in 1913
Ship fires
Shipwrecks of the Washington coast